Edmond William Bury (4 November 1884 – 5 December 1915) was a British rackets player who competed in the 1908 Summer Olympics.

He won the silver medal in the men's doubles competition together with Cecil Browning. In the men's singles event he did not participate.

Bury was killed in action, aged 31, during the First World War, serving as a captain with the King's Royal Rifle Corps near Fleurbaix. He was buried in the Rue-Petillon Military Cemetery nearby.

See also
 List of Olympians killed in World War I

References

External links
Profile

1884 births
1915 deaths
Racquets players
Olympic racquets players of Great Britain
Racquets players at the 1908 Summer Olympics
Olympic silver medallists for Great Britain
King's Royal Rifle Corps officers
British military personnel killed in World War I
British Army personnel of World War I
Medalists at the 1908 Summer Olympics
20th-century British people
Burials in Hauts-de-France
People from Kensington
Sportspeople from London
Military personnel from London